Racing Club de Avellaneda, officially known as Racing Club or shortened to just Racing, is an Argentine professional sports club based in Avellaneda, a city of the Buenos Aires Province. Founded in 1903, Racing has been historically considered one of the "big five" clubs of Argentine football, and is also known as "El Primer Grande" (The first big club), for becoming the first club in the world to win seven league titles in a row, first Argentine club to win a national cup, and the first world champion (Intercontinental Cup) Argentine club. Racing currently plays in the Primera División, the top division of the Argentine league system, and plays its home games at Estadio Presidente Perón, nicknamed El Cilindro de Avellaneda (in English: "The Cylinder of Avellaneda").

Racing has won the Primera División 18 times, with a record of seven consecutive championships between 1913 and 1919, five of which were won undefeated. Not only does Racing hold the record for the most consecutive titles in Argentine football history, but it is also the only team in South America to achieve such a feat, along with being one of only four clubs (the others are Olympique de Lyon, Bayern Munich and Juventus) to be a seven-time champion of world-cup winning nations.

The club also has 15 National cups to its name, which include five Copa Ibarguren, four Copa de Honor Municipalidad de Buenos Aires and one Copa Beccar Varela. Due to those achievements the team was nicknamed La Academia ("The Academy of Football") which still identifies the club and its supporters.

On the international stage, the club has won 6 titles, with 3 of them organised by CONMEBOL and other international bodies. Those achievements include one Copa Libertadores, one Intercontinental Cup and the first edition of the Supercopa Libertadores.

The team's home colors are sky blue and white striped, similar to the national team. The shorts and socks have shifted between black, navy blue or white. Apart from football, other sports practised at Racing are artistic gymnastics, basketball, beach soccer, boxing, chess, field hockey, futsal, handball, martial arts, roller skating, tennis and volleyball.

History

Origins

The origins of the club can be traced to the end of the 19th century, when a group of Buenos Aires Great Southern Railway employees asked for permission to play football in a field belonging to the company. As the request was approved, they started to play their first matches there, mostly against teams formed by British immigrants.

In 1898, they founded a club, "Argentinos Excelsior Club", which lasted three years until in 1901, three new clubs were established "Sud América Fútbol Club de Barracas al Sur", "American Club" and "Argentinos Unidos", with Barracas al Sur the most notable of them. Nevertheless, the club was soon disbanded, establishing "Colorados Unidos" on 16 March 1902. On 25 March 1903, both clubs met at Mercado de Hacienda with the purpose of merging again.

The club took its name from a French auto racing magazine owned by Germán Vidaillac (a founding partner of French ancestry). The suggestion was well received and the name "Racing Club" was immediately approved. Racing was the first football team integrally formed by criollo people.

The first jersey worn by the emerging club was white, until 25 July 1904, when it was decided a yellow and black vertical striped jersey would be used. Nevertheless, the recently adopted uniform only lasted a week due to its similarity to Uruguayan club CURCC, being replaced by a design proposed by president Luis Carbone. The jersey had four squares, two light blue and two pink. This light blue and pink design would be worn until 1908, once again replaced by a design with three horizontal bars (two blue and one white). Finally, Racing adopted the light blue and white colors in 1910, in commemoration of the May Revolution's 100th anniversary that same year.

First years in football

Racing affiliated to the Argentine Football Association in 1905, and began playing in the lower divisions of Argentine football league system. In 1906 the club registered to play in Segunda División.

In 1909, Racing competed in a playoff to promote to Primera División, but lost to Gimnasia y Esgrima de Buenos Aires. Racing finally promoted to the first division in 1910, winning the playoff final against Boca Juniors with an attendance of 4,000. The starting line-up that won the promotion was: Fernández; Seminario, Allan; Winne, Juan Ohaco, Angel Betular; Oyarzábal, A. Ohaco, Firpo, Frers and Juan Perinetti. Frers and Ohaco were the scorers for Racing. The popularity of the club raised after that promotion, increasing its number of supporters.

"The Academy" and the seven consecutive

In 1911 Racing debuted in Primera División, finishing in fourth place.

One year later, Racing won its first domestic cup, the Copa de Honor Municipalidad de Buenos Aires after beating Newell's Old Boys 3–0. Racing also played its first international match, versus Uruguayan team River Plate.

The first league title came in 1913 when Racing defeated San Isidro and River Plate in a playoff. Racing first eliminated River Plate (3–0), and then played the final against San Isidro, winning 2–0.

In 1914, Racing won its second league title, having scored 42 goals and only 7 conceded in 12 games. The runner-up was Estudiantes (BA). That same year Racing won its second consecutive Copa Ibarguren, defeating another Rosarino team, Rosario Central, by 1–0 in Buenos Aires. The line-up for the match: Arduino; Reyes, S. Ochoa; Pepe, Olazar, Betular; Canavery, Ohaco, Marcovecchio, Juan Hospital, Juan Perinetti.

Racing became Primera División champion in 1915 when they defeated San Isidro 1–0 in a playoff at Independiente's stadium. Their line-up was: Arduino; Presta, Reyes; Betular, Olazar, Pepe; Canavery, Ohaco, Marcovecchio (who scored the only goal), Juan Hospital, Juan Perinetti. Racing finished unbeaten, with 22 games won and 2 drawn, with and 95 goals scored with only 5 conceded.

Racing won the following title, the 1916 championship, totalizing 34 points in 21 games with 39 goals converted and 10 conceded at the end of the tournament. Platense was the runner-up with 30 points. The 5th consecutive title was in 1917 after totalizing 35 points, being River Plate the runner-up with 30 points. The team also scored a total of 58 goals with only 4 conceded in 20 fixtures. In addition, the squad achieved its third Copa Ibarguren with a smashing victory over Rosario Central by 6–0 in Avellaneda. The line-up was: Arduino; Ohaco, Reyes, Viazzi Olazar, Ricardo Pepe; Canavery, Vivaldi, Marcovecchio, Juan Hospital, Juan Perinetti.

That same year Racing won another edition of Copa Ibarguren, defeating by 2nd. consecutive time Rosario Central by 3–2 at GEBA stadium. The line-up was: Crocce; Castagnola, Reyes; Vivaldi, Olazar, Pepe; Natalio Perinetti, Ohaco, Marcovecchio, Minondo, Juan Perinetti.

One year later, Racing won its 6th. league title, remaining unbeaten after 19 games played, with 49 goals scored and 9 conceded. Racing also won another edition of Copa Ibarguren (5 in total) with a large victory over Newell's Old Boys by 4–0 at GEBA. The line-up: Crocce; Castagnola, Reyes; Ohaco, Marcovecchio, Macchiavello; Natalio Perinetti, Zabaleta, Vivaldo, Juan Hospital, Juan Perinetti.

In 1919 Racing moved to the dissident league "Asociación Amateurs de Football", winning the tournament whilst remaining unbeaten again. Racing played 23 fixtures, winning its 7th. consecutive title with 26 points and 43 goals scored. They won further titles in 1921 and 1925.

The 1930–1940s
Racing was one of the founding members as the first professional league in Argentina, Liga Argentina de Football, that split from the AFA to organise its own championships. During those years Racing won the Copa Beccar Varela in 1932 (defeating Boca Juniors 3–0 in the final) and the Copa de Competencia (LAF) one year later, thrashing San Lorenzo de Almagro 4–0 in the final match. Despite the national cups won, Racing could not win any domestic championship during that period; its best performances were third places in 1932, 1933 and 1936. Evaristo Barrera was the top scorer with 34 goals in 1934 and 32 in 1936.

In 1945 Racing won the first edition of Copa de Competencia Británica defeating Boca Juniors by 4–1 in the final. Despite its domestic cup achievements, Racing didn't win any league title until 1949, starting with another brilliant era of three consecutive championships.

Return to league titles 

Racing won the championship three years running between 1949 and 1951. In 1949 Racing finished with 49 points. Besides, two players of the club, Juan José Pizzuti and Llamil Simes, were the topscorers of the tournament with 26 goals each. In 1950, Simes was the topscorer of the time again. That same year, Racing inaugurated its new venue, Estadio Presidente Perón, the second largest stadium of Argentina. Racing won its third consecutive league title in 1951 after beating Banfield 1–0 in a two-leg series. The starting line-up was Héctor Grisetti; Higinio García, José M. Pérez; Juán Gimenez, Alberto Rastelli, Jorge Gutiérrez; Mario Boyé, Manuel Ameal, Rubén Bravo, Llamil Simes, Ezra Sued, with Guillermo Stábile as coach.

Racing could not achieve a four-consecutive title after in 1952 the team finished 2nd to River Plate. The next league title came in 1958, and they were runners-up to San Lorenzo de Almagro the following year.

During those years Racing Club had many notable players that made their contribution to the successful campaigns. Some of them were Norberto Mendez, Rubén Bravo, Llamil Simes, Mario Boyé, Alberto Rastelli, Pedro Dellacha, Ezra Sued, Roberto Blanco, Ernesto Gutiérrez, Pedro Manfredini, Arnaldo Balay, Juan José Pizzuti, Rubén Héctor Sosa and Omar Oreste Corbatta.

International success

Racing finished 4th in 1960 with a top scoring 72 goals. During this tournament Racing also achieved its largest victory in Primera División, an 11–3 against Rosario Central.

In 1961 Racing won another league championship with manager Saúl Ongaro, while also being the highest scoring team in the league with 68 goals. The next year, Racing finished 9th and was also eliminated from the Copa Libertadores in the first stage. Racing won the Primera Division title again in 1966, scoring 70 goals.

In the 1967 Torneo Metropolitano Racing reached the final where the team lost to Estudiantes de La Plata 3–0. That same year Racing won the 1967 Copa Libertadores after beating Uruguayan team Nacional 2–1 in the final. Norberto Raffo was the top scorer with 13 goals.

At the end of the year Racing won the Intercontinental Cup by defeating Celtic in a playoff game. The first match had been played at Glasgow where Racing was beaten 1–0 while they won the second game 2–1 in Avellaneda. The playoff was played in Montevideo where Racing achieved its second continental championship winning 1–0 with a goal scored by Juan Carlos Cárdenas. The starting line-up for the playoff match on 4 November was: Agustín Cejas; Oscar Martín, Roberto Perfumo, Alfio Basile, Nelson Chabay; João Cardoso, Juan Carlos Rulli, Juan J. Rodríguez, Humberto Maschio; Norberto Raffo, Juan Carlos Cárdenas. Juan José Pizzuti was the coach.

Relegation
During the 1970s Racing did not win any title, although the team finished 2nd to San Lorenzo in the 1972 Metropolitano, with 43 points in 34 matches. That year was the debut of Ubaldo Fillol, who some regard as the best Argentine goalkeeper ever. Fillol set a record of 6 penalty shots stopped in the same season. From 1974 and 1978 Racing made poor campaigns and was near relegation in 1976 when the team finished next to last (San Telmo was finally relegated).

In 1983, Racing was relegated to the Primera B by finishing last in the aggregate table, which was determined by a points average of the previous two seasons. However, the relegation system was changed, and if it had not been changed, Racing probably wouldn't have been relegated. The old system had the two last-placed teams go down, and Racing finished 17th out of 19 that year. The first year in the second division, Racing finished second behind Deportivo Español and so had to play a promotion playoff, where Racing eliminated Deportivo Morón and Lanús but lost to Gimnasia y Esgrima (LP) in the finals (1–3 and 2–4).

One year later, after two seasons in the second division, Racing returned to the top division for the 1986–87 season after winning a playoff for the second promotion place against Atlanta in December 1985. Racing won the first game 4–0 and the second match finished 1–1, with Racing winning the series 5–1 on aggregate.

Return to international success

Racing won its third international competition in 1988, when the team won the first edition of the 1988 Supercopa Libertadores, defeating Brazilian team Cruzeiro in the finals, with Alfio Basile still as coach. That same year Racing won the non-official Supercopa Interamericana beating Herediano from Costa Rica 3–0. The following year, Racing played the inaugural edition of the Recopa Sudamericana in 1989 against the winners of the 1988 Copa Libertadores, Club Nacional. Nacional won the first leg in Montevideo 1–0; Racing wasn't able to turn the score around in the second leg in Buenos Aires, and the Uruguayan club won the title.

In 1992, Racing played the Supercopa Libertadores finals against Cruzeiro again. In the first match, Cruzeiro defeated them 4–0 in Belo Horizonte. Racing won the second match 1–0 but the cup was awarded to the Brazilian team with a 4–1 aggregate score.

Racing came very close to winning the league title in the 90s; in the 1993 Apertura they finished third, tied with Velez and just one point from the champion, River Plate. In the 1995 Apertura they finished runner-ups.

Bankruptcy and resurrection
In July 1998, club president Daniel Lalín declared bankruptcy, leaving many supporters outraged. Lalin had been accused as the main reason for the club's debt because he spent large amounts of money on players, instead of bringing them up from the youth academy. In March 1999, a top member of the club said Racing "had officially ceased to exist". However, with the massive support of the fans, they convinced the club to implement the Trust law, saving it from liquidation. In December 2000, the club was taken over by Blanquiceleste SA and was managed by the company until 2008.

They won the league title in December 2001 for the first time in 35 years, and the title was celebrated at Estadio Jose Amalfitani, Vélez Sarsfield's home stadium, after the last fixture with them finished in a draw.

In 2008, the club was almost relegated and had to play a promotion play-off against Belgrano. This was due to poor performances in the last 3 seasons, including a last-place finish in the 2008 Clausura. The first leg was played in Córdoba on 25 June and ended 1–1. In the second leg, Racing won 1–0 at home, and with a 2–1 aggregate score, was able to maintain its permanence in the top tier.

In 2012, Racing reached the 2012 Copa Argentina Final, where the squad lost to Boca Juniors 2–1.

In June 2014, Diego Cocca was hired as head coach. Two days after Cocca signed his contract, former player and fan favorite Diego Milito left Inter Milan and returned to the club to play the 2014 Torneo de Transición. In December 2014, Racing won its 17th Primera División title in the last fixture of the tournament. If Racing drew but River Plate won their match against Quilmes, then the title would've gone to River. However, the team defeated Godoy Cruz 1–0 to secure the 1st place and be crowned champions for the first time in 13 years.

They won the league in 2018–19. Lisandro López was the top scorer of the tournament with 17 goals, and at the age of 36 he was the oldest player to be league top scorer. In December 2019, Racing became champion of the Trofeo de Campeones de la Superliga Argentina by beating the defending champion of the Copa de la Superliga, Tigre, 2–0, with both goals from Matías Rojas.

Stadium 

Racing Club plays its home games at "Estadio Presidente Perón" (named in honor of former President of Argentina Juan Domingo Perón), popularly known as "El Cilindro de Avellaneda" (due to its cylindrical shape) and "the Coliseum". It was opened in 1950 and restructured in 1997.

The field measures 105 x 70 m. Racing's stadium is the second largest in Argentina after the River Plate stadium. In the beginning, the venue could host a capacity of 120,000 but subsequent restructurings reduced its capacity to 64,161.

Players

Current squad
.

Out on loan

All-time player records

Most appearances

Topscorers

Coaches since 2000

Honours

National

League
 Primera División (18): 1913, 1914, 1915, 1916, 1917, 1918, 1919, 1921, 1925, 1949, 1950, 1951, 1958, 1961, 1966, 2001 Apertura, 2014, 2018–19
Segunda División (3): 1910, 1924 , 1926 AAm  
Tercera División (3): 1911, 1919, 1929

National Cups
Copa Dr. Carlos Ibarguren (5): 1913, 1914, 1916, 1917, 1918
Copa de Honor Municipalidad de Buenos Aires (4): 1912, 1913, 1915, 1917
Copa de Honor Beccar Varela (1): 1932
Copa de Competencia (LAF) (1): 1933
Copa de Competencia Británica (1): 1945
Trofeo de Campeones de la Superliga Argentina (1): 2019
Trofeo de Campeones de la Liga Profesional (1): 2022
Supercopa Internacional (1): 2022

International
Intercontinental Cup (1): 1967
Copa Libertadores (1): 1967
Supercopa Libertadores (1): 1988
Copa de Honor Cousenier (1): 1913
Copa Aldao (2): 1917, 1918

Notes

References

External links

 

Racing Club de Avellaneda
Association football clubs established in 1903
Basketball teams in Buenos Aires Province
r
Argentine volleyball teams
1903 establishments in Argentina
Football clubs in Avellaneda
Copa Libertadores winning clubs
Intercontinental Cup winning clubs